Andrea Fabbri (born 5 October 1992) is an Italian former ice dancer, who competed with Carolina Moscheni for Italy. Moscheni/Fabbri are the 2019 Italian national bronze medalists.   

With his previous partner Misato Komatsubara, he won five international medals, including silver at the 2015 CS Ice Challenge.

Personal life 
Andrea Fabbri was born on 5 October 1992 in Milan. He is the brother of Marco Fabbri.

Career

Early years 
Fabbri began learning to skate in 1999. With partner Alessia Busi, he won the junior silver medal at the 2012 and 2013 Italian Championships. The duo finished 17th at the 2013 World Junior Championships.

Partnership with Komatsubara 
Fabbri and Japan's Misato Komatsubara represented Italy on the senior level. Their international debut came in October 2014 at the Ondrej Nepela Trophy, a Challenger Series (CS) event where they finished 6th. After winning bronze medals at the Santa Claus Cup and Italian Championships, they were sent to the 2015 European Championships in Stockholm, where they placed 23rd. The two ended their season with gold at the Bavarian Open.

In 2015–16, Komatsubara/Fabbri took bronze at the Lombardia Trophy and then appeared at two Challenger Series events, winning silver at the Ice Challenge. After obtaining another silver medal, at the Santa Claus Cup, they repeated as national bronze medalists and went on to compete at the 2016 European Championships in Bratislava, where they finished 21st. They were coached by Barbara Fusar-Poli and Stefano Caruso in Milan, Italy.

Komatsubara and Fabbri ended their partnership in April 2016.

Partnership with Moscheni 
Fabbri began competing with Carolina Moscheni in the 2017–18 figure skating season. They placed fourth at their first Italian national championships in Milan.

In the 2018-19 season, Moscheni/Fabbri won the bronze medal at the 2019 Italian Championships. This qualified them to compete at the 2019 European Championships. In Minsk, they placed twenty-first in the rhythm dance, missing the free dance by 0.72 points.
They ended their season at the Egna Dance Trophy in February, where they finished fourth overall.

On June 13, 2019, Moscheni posted on social media that Fabbri had retired from figure skating.

Programs

With Moscheni

With Komatsubara

With Busi

Competitive highlights 
CS: Challenger Series; JGP: Junior Grand Prix

With Moscheni

With Komatsubara

With Busi

References

External links 

 
 
 

1992 births
Italian male ice dancers
Living people
Figure skaters from Milan